Katarzynki  is a settlement in the administrative district of Gmina Bledzew, within Międzyrzecz County, Lubusz Voivodeship, in western Poland.

The settlement has a population of 7.

References

Katarzynki